Tierps HK is a Swedish ice hockey club, based in Tierp, Uppsala County.  The club, which was founded in 1957, played two seasons in Sweden's second-tier hockey league 2000–2002, but since then has been playing in the third-tier league, Division 1.

External links
 Official site
 Club profile on Eliteprospects.com

References

Ice hockey teams in Sweden
Ice hockey teams in Uppsala County